Daikon or mooli, Raphanus sativus var. longipinnatus, is a mild-flavored winter radish usually characterized by fast-growing leaves and a long, white,  root. Originally native to continental East Asia, daikon is harvested and consumed throughout the region, as well as in South Asia, and is available internationally. In some locations, daikon is planted for its ability to break up compacted soils and recover nutrients but is not harvested.

Names
Historical ties to South Asia permit mooli as a general synonym in English. The generic terms white radish, winter radish, Oriental radish, long white radish, and other terms are also used. Other synonyms usually vary by region or describe regional varieties of the vegetable. When it is necessary to distinguish the usual Japanese form from others, it is sometimes known as Japanese radish.

The vegetable's Chinese names are still uncommon in English. In most forms of Chinese cuisine, it is usually known as bái luóbo (Chinese white radish). Although in Cantonese and Malaysian cuisine, it is encountered as lobak or lo pak, which are Cantonese pronunciations of the general Chinese term for "radish" or "carrot". In the cuisines of Hokkien and Teochew-speaking areas such as Singapore, Thailand, and Taiwan, it is also known as chai tow or chai tau. Any of these may be referred to as "radish," with the regional variety implied by context. In English-speaking countries, it is also sometimes marketed as icicle radish.

In mainland China and Singapore, the calque white carrot or misnomer carrot is sometimes used, owing to the similarity of the vegetables' names in Mandarin and Hokkien. This variant inspired the title for a popular guidebook on Singaporean street food, There's No Carrot in Carrot Cake, which refers to chai tow kway, a kind of cake made from daikon.

In North America, it is primarily grown not for food but as a fallow crop, with the roots left unharvested to prevent soil compaction; the leaves (if harvested) are used as animal fodder. The official general name used by the United States Department of Agriculture is oilseed radish, but this is only used in non-culinary contexts. Other English terms employed when daikon is being used as animal feed or as a soil ripper are "forage radish," "fodder radish," and "tillage radish."

In Hong Kong, the misnomer turnip is also used. This name lends its name to the dish "turnip cake."

Varieties

Several nonwhite varieties occur. The Cantonese lobak, lo pak, etc., sometimes refer to the usual Chinese form but is also applied to a form of daikon with a light green coloration of the top area of the root around the leaves. The Korean radish, also called mu, has a similar pale green shade halfway down from the top and are generally shorter, stouter, and sturdier, with denser flesh and softer leaves. Both are often spicier than the long white radishes.

The heirloom watermelon radish is another Chinese variety of daikon with a dull green exterior but a bright rose or fuchsia-colored center. Its Chinese name   xīnlǐměi luóbó) is sometimes irregularly romanized as the shinrimei radish and sometimes translated as the "beauty heart," "beautiful heart inside," or "roseheart" radish.

Cultivation

The Chinese and Indian varieties tolerate higher temperatures than the Japanese ones. These varieties also grow well at lower elevations in East Africa. If moisture is abundant, it can grow quickly; otherwise, the flesh becomes overly tough and pungent. The variety Long White Icicle is available as seed in Britain and will grow very successfully in Southern England, producing roots resembling a parsnip by midsummer in good garden soil in an average year.

The roots can be stored for weeks without the leaves if lifted and kept in a cool, dry place. If left in the ground, the texture tends to become woody, but the storage life of whole untreated roots is not long.

Certain varieties of daikon can be grown as a winter cover crop and green manure. These varieties are often named "tillage radish" because the plant grows a huge, penetrating root that effectively performs deep cultivation. The roots bring nutrients lower in the soil profile up into the higher reaches and are good nutrient scavengers, so they are good partners with legumes instead of grasses; if harsh winters occur, the root will decompose while in the soil, releasing early nitrogen stores in the spring.

Culinary use

In Japan, many types of pickles are made with daikon roots, including takuan and bettarazuke. Daikon roots can be served raw, in salads, or as sashimi'''s , which is prepared by meticulous .  is frequently used as a garnish, often mixed into various dippings such as ponzu, a soy sauce and citrus juice condiment. The pink spicy  is daikon grated with chili pepper. Simmered dishes are also popular such as oden. Daikon that has been shredded and dried (a common method of preserving food in Japan) is called . Daikon radish sprouts are used raw for salad or garnishing sashimi. Daikon leaves are frequently eaten as a green vegetable. They are thorny when raw, so softening methods such as pickling and stir frying are common. The daikon leaf is one of the Festival of Seven Herbs, where it is called suzushiro.

In Chinese cuisine, turnip cake and chai tow kway are made with daikon. The variety called mooli has a high water content, and some cookbooks recommend salting (or sweetening, depending on the region and context) and draining it before it is cooked. Sometimes, mooli is used as a medium for elaborately carved garnishes. More commonly, daikon is referred as bailuobo (白蘿蔔) in Mandarin or lobak in Cantonese. Bailuobo is used in various dishes for its unique and mild flavour after being boiled and cooked. For soups, bailuobo can be seen in daikon and pork rib soup (白蘿蔔排骨湯), daikon and tomato soup (白蘿蔔番茄湯), daikon and tofu soup (白蘿蔔豆腐湯), etc. Delicacies such as "shredded daikon" (白蘿蔔絲) and "cut daikon" (白蘿蔔塊) are popular domestic dishes too. Similar to Japanese cuisine, there are many types of pickles (in Mandarin Chinese: 咸菜 xiáncài / 榨菜 zhàcài) made with daikon, for example, "sour-sweet cut daikon" (酸甜白蘿蔔塊), "spicy daikon" (麻辣白蘿蔔), daikon zhacai (白蘿蔔榨菜), etc.

In North India, daikon is a popular ingredient used to make sabzi, stuffed paranthas, pakodas, salads, pickles, and as garnish. The plant's leaves are used to make dal and kadhi, among other dishes. In South India, daikon is the principal ingredient in a variety of sambar, in which roundels of the radish are boiled with onions, tamarind pulp, lentils, and a special spice powder. When cooked, it can release a very strong odor. This soup, called mullangi sambar (literally, "radish sambar") is very popular and is often mixed with rice.

In Vietnamese cuisine, sweet and sour pickled daikon and carrots ( or đồ chua) are a common condiment in bánh mì sandwiches.

In the Philippines, the sour stew sinigang may include daikon. Daikon is known locally as labanos.

In Pakistani cuisine, the young leaves of the daikon plant are boiled and flash-fried with a mixture of heated oil, garlic, ginger, red chili, and various spices. The radish is eaten as a fresh salad, often seasoned with either salt and pepper or chaat masala. In Punjab province, daikon is used to stuff pan-fried breads known as paratha. Daikon's seed pods called moongray in local languages, are also eaten as a stir-fried dish across the country.

In Bangladesh, fresh daikon is often finely grated and mixed with fresh chili, coriander, flaked steamed fish, lime juice, and salt. This light, refreshing preparation served alongside meals is known as mulo bhorta''.

Fermenting radish normally releases a strong and noxious smell like bad flatulence or rotting cabbage.

Nutritional information

Daikon is mostly water and very low in food energy. A 100-gram serving contains only 76 kilojoules. Daikon also contains the active enzyme myrosinase.

Agricultural use 
Tillage radish leaves behind a cavity in the soil when the large tap root decays, making it easier for the following year's crops, such as potatoes, to bore deeper into the soil. Potatoes grown in a rotation with tillage radish do not experience growth restrictions associated with having a shallow hardpan soil, as the tillage radish can break the hardpan, making the transfer of water and other important nutrients much easier for the root system.

Nutrient retention is another important feature of tillage radish. The large tap root is used to retain macro- and micro-nutrients that would otherwise have the potential to be lost to leaching during the time when the field would otherwise be left empty. The nutrients from the root become readily available for the following year's crop upon the decay of the radish, which can boost yields and reduce fertilizer costs.

Daikons are also used as a forage worldwide. As a forage, they also have the side benefit of weed suppression. Although used elsewhere for much longer, daikon as a forage is a recent introduction in Massachusetts field practice.

Other use 
Daikon is used in preparing metal surfaces for chemical patination, for example, under the Rokushō process.

See also 
 Radish
 Chonggak radish
 Gegeol radish
 Korean radish
 Sakurajima radish
 Takuan
 Nanakusa-no-sekku and Jinjitsu
 Japanese radish

References

External links

Asian Radish at NutritionData.com

Asian radishes
Leaf vegetables
Root vegetables
Japanese cuisine terms
Asian vegetables
Japanese vegetables